The 2012 special election in Michigan's 11th congressional district was a special election that took place in Michigan on November 6, 2012, to replace Republican United States Congressman Thaddeus McCotter, who resigned after a failed presidential campaign and a series of scandals. Former autoworker David Curson, the Democratic nominee, narrowly defeated Republican nominee Kerry Bentivolio, a reindeer farmer, to win the seat for the last few months of McCotter's term.

Schedule
As a matter of convenience and cost saving, this special election was held in conjunction with the regularly scheduled general election on November 6, 2012. Voters were asked on the November ballot to select two candidates: one to serve the remainder of McCotter's term in the 112th Congress, and the other to serve the full 2-year term in the 113th Congress beginning in January 2013.

Democratic primary

Candidates
 David Curson, labor activist

Despite the fact that Canton Township Trustee Syed Taj was the Democratic nominee in the regularly-scheduled general election, Taj did not opt to run in the special election and Curson did not opt to run in the general election.

Results

Republican primary

Candidates
 Kerry Bentivolio, reindeer farmer
 Nancy Cassis, former State Senator
 Kenneth Crider, steel worker
 Carolyn Kavanagh
 Steve King, former member of the Livonia School Board

Results

General election
The election to fill the remaining 6 weeks of McCotter's term was largely ignored as the attention was focused on the presidential election and the race for the full two-year term between Bentivolio and Taj.

Candidates
Kerry Bentivolio, Republican nominee
David Curson, Democratic nominee
John J. Tartar, Libertarian Party nominee
Marc J. Sosnowski, Constitution Party nominee

Election results

See also
List of special elections to the United States House of Representatives
Michigan's 11th congressional district

References

United States House of Representatives 11 special
Michigan 11 special
2012 11 special
Michigan 2012 11
Michigan 11
United States House of Representatives 2012 11